"Take It Off" is a song by American recording artist and songwriter Kesha, from her debut album, Animal. It was written by Kesha Sebert, Lukasz Gottwald and Claude Kelly and it was produced by Dr. Luke with vocal editing done by Emily Wright. It was released as the fourth and final single from the album on July 13, 2010. "Take It Off"'s initial writing consisted of Kesha attending a drag show and becoming turned on by drag queens taking their clothing off. The song is an upbeat song that uses heavy amounts of auto tune and utilizes an electro infused beat, driven by a melody known as the Arabian riff.

Due to strong digital sales from the release of Animal, the song charted in the United States, the United Kingdom and Canada before being announced as a single. After being released as a single, the song reached the top ten in Canada, Australia and the United States, and reached number one on Hungarian radio. With the song reaching the top-ten in the United States, Kesha became only the eleventh artist in history to amass four top-tens from a debut album.

Two music videos for the single were released. The first video features Kesha and her friends on a distant planet, dancing around in a mosh pit while slowly turning into stardust as the video progresses. The inspiration for the video, according to Kesha, was about shedding your inhibitions and being "raw and real." The second video released for the song features Jeffree Star and incorporates a more dominant animal theme, while drawing from 80s themed inspiration such as: Tron, David Bowie in Labyrinth, and Revenge of the Nerds. To promote the single Kesha performed "Take It Off" alongside earlier singles "Your Love Is My Drug" and "Tik Tok" on NBC's Today.

Writing and inspiration
"Take It Off" was written by Kesha, alongside Dr. Luke and Claude Kelly. It was recorded at Conway Recording Studios in Los Angeles, California, and at Dr. Luke's studio in that city. The song was produced by Luke with vocal editing done by Emily Wright. The main riff of the chorus is the same as that of "The Streets of Cairo", also using a similar rhyme scheme and parallel phrasing. During an interview with Esquire magazine Kesha was asked about her song writing process and used "Take It Off" as an example of how her songs come to fruition. She explained that the song came about when she was out one night and was visiting a drag bar, stating, "I have a song ... called 'Take It Off' about when I went to a drag show, and how really turned on I was by these transvestite men taking clothes off. I was like, What does that even make me?".

Composition

"Take It Off" is an upbeat dominant song that utilizes a "thumping, electro-infused beat with furious crescendos." Dr. Luke's production has been described as a "bubblegummy electro" number that uses a nursery rhyme hook in its delivery. Kesha's vocals on the song were noted for their heavy amounts of Auto-Tune. Daniel Brockman from The Phoenix described the song as "a heavily Auto-Tuned reworking" of "There's a Place in France". Monica Herrera from Billboard however, felt that the song "lifted heavily from Robert Miles' 1995 trance-lite hit, "Children". Lyrically, "Take It Off" discusses opposite-sex objectification and its theme is literal to the title.

According to sheet music published at Musicnotes.com by Kobalt Music Publishing, the song is written in common time with a moderate beat rate of 125 beats per minute. The song is written in the key of F minor and has the sequence of D–E–Fm as the chord progression. Kesha's vocal range in the song spans from the note of F3 to the note of C5. Music reviewer Bill Lamb commented on the lyrical writing of the song noting that the lyrics were symbolic, stating, "[the song] manages to expand out into an anthem about free expression ... [a] celebration of the power of the night, and a bit of alcohol, to help shed inhibitions of the daytime." Lamb further commented that the lyrics drew similar reference to that of Lady Gaga's commenting, "followers of Lady Gaga's Monster Ball Tour will be familiar with this point of view [about free expression]."

Critical reception

Amar Toor from AOL Radio gave the song a positive review saying, "Much like the rest of the album, this new song is simply made for the dance floor. And, much like Kesha herself, the track seems to embody relentless, carefree hedonism at its best." He also noted, "And when Kesha talks about a 'place I know', where 'they go hardcore and there's glitter on the floor' in the style of a six-grade camp ditty, it's hard for anyone to not feel the urge to just take it off." Bill Lamb of About.com gave the single four out of five stars. He was concerned with the overall lyrical depth and over-use of auto-tune but he complimented the song for its "irresistibly catchy beat and chorus" with a "celebratory mood of dropping inhibitions." He noted that "with the volume turned up and the chorus encouraging you to 'take it off,' you may just feel inspired to follow the commands. The ultimate effect by the end of the song is very cathartic as it hints strongly that there is more to "take off" than simply clothing." Andrew Burgess from musicOMH wrote that on the song the singer "oozes swagger." Melinda Newman of HitFix used "Take It Off" as an example of Kesha's songwriting, noting that tracks which weren't over-thought were "fine". Newman wrote that "thinking too much is what gets Kesha, who co-wrote the songs here, in trouble. She’s fine wading in the shallow end with bouncy tunes like the literal 'Take It Off'."

Monica Herrera from Billboard magazine criticized the song for its demonstration of overly processed vocals noting how easily an artist can "get lost in a sea of auto-tone". She went on to state that it "make[s] it hard to tell whether the California party girl can actually sing". Robert Copsey of Digital Spy met the song with a mixed review. He commented on the choice of the single, noting "the glimpses of emotion shown on her last offering, 'Your Love Is My Drug', are as long gone as her sobriety." Although he was not completely convinced he wrote, "[though] the vocals are more processed than a cheese string ... the combination of a playful nursery rhyme hook and Dr Luke's bubblegummy electro production make this a pretty irresistible little dancefloor ditty." He went on to give the single three out of five stars. Fraser McAlpine of BBC met the song with a mixed review giving the song three out of five stars. Fraser criticized the choice of the song commenting, "there's a fear that if Kesha reveals that she's a sensitive young flower after all, with real feelings and a good, pure heart, her appeal with disappear like a soap bubble on a cactus, can it?". Nate Adams of No Ripcord was negative in his review of the song, calling it "outright stupid" and noted it would be something commonly heard on a playground. Adams wrote that the song touched on opposite-sex objectification, but wrote that the theme became wearisome on the album, using the song as one of the examples where the theme was overused.

Chart performance

In January 2010, due to strong digital sales, the song charted in the United States, Canada, and the United Kingdom, debuting at numbers 85, 45, and 112 respectively. In the United States, the song re-entered the Billboard Hot 100 at number 92 on the issue date of August 7, 2010. The song steadily ascended the charts for six weeks before eventually reaching a peak of eight on its eighth week on the chart. With the song charting in the top-ten it became Kesha's fourth consecutive top-ten single and she became the 11th female artist in history to attain four top-ten singles off of a debut album. On December 13, 2018, the song received a 3× Platinum certification by the Recording Industry Association of America (RIAA) for sales of 3,000,000 units. With this feat Kesha became the second lead artist, following Lady Gaga, to achieve four million selling songs in 2010. The song later crossed the two million paid downloads mark in February 2011, becoming her fifth song to do so. As of June 2011, the song has sold 2,134,000 copies in the United States. As of March 2016, "Take it Off" has sold 2.5 million digital copies.

In Canada, following its debut on the chart from Animal'''s release, the song ascended and descended the chart for 12 weeks before eventually dropping off the chart. On July 13, 2010, the song re-entered the chart at 86. After ascending the chart for seven weeks the single reached an eventual peak of eight. In the United Kingdom, the song was listed on the UK Singles Chart for one week, dropping off the following week. On the issue date of August 28, 2010 the single re-entered the chart at 44. After steadily ascending the charts, the song eventually reached a peak of 15. In New Zealand, "Take It Off" entered the chart at 32 on the issue date of July 12, 2010. In the succeeding week the single rose ten spots to attain position 22. The song has since been certified gold by the Recording Industry Association of New Zealand (RIANZ). After eight more weeks of steadily ascending the charts the single reached a peak of 11 on its tenth total week on the chart. On August 22, 2010, the single entered the Australian Singles Chart at 29. The song ascended the chart for three weeks eventually reaching a peak of five. It has since been certified two times Platinum by the Australian Recording Industry Association (ARIA) for sales of 140,000 units.

Music videos

First version

The original video for "Take It Off" premiered on Vevo on August 3, 2010.  It was directed by Paul Hunter and Dori Oskowitz. Kesha revealed the main idea behind the video in an interview explaining that "[the video was] about [her] and all [her] hot vampire babe friends breaking into a hotel on another planet, and at the end we all turn into this beautiful stardust. Once you take it all off, all your inhibitions, your clothes, we're all made up of the same thing." She explained that she did not want the video to just be about "Taking it off", that the message behind the video and the theme wasn't "just about taking off your clothes and rolling in glitter. It's also about taking off your inhibitions and being raw and real".

The video starts off with Kesha seen on a motorcycle. She proceeds to walk as her friends follow behind her as they enter a motel area. As the chorus of the song starts, Kesha and her friends start to run around the motel dancing and jumping off railings. The friends gather around an empty pool and start tearing at each other's clothing; While this is happening it is revealed they that are on a different planet and Kesha is seen rolling around in sand. Slowly as some of the friends start taking off their clothing, they begin to turn into star dust. The group starts to dance in the pool with some of the party goers exploding into dust. The remainder of the friends continue to dance in the dust that is now covering the bottom of the pool. As this is happening they all begin to lose different parts of their bodies as they explode into multicolored star dust. The video ends with everyone as dust with Kesha beginning to "unzip" herself as she turns into yellow dust.

Jocelyn Vena of MTV News met the video with a positive review. She noted that Kesha "manages to embrace her inner party animal and throw a neo-colored party at an abandoned motel in the middle of nowhere." She stated that "While the concept of "a lot of pretty people dancing at dusk" is pretty simple, the neo colors manage to amp up the video, as does the colored sand that's thrown around in the air and mixed with glitter." Her conclusion of the video and of Kesha was that as simple as it may be, "she manages to be both sexy and fun while rolling around in the desert. wenomechainsama." Melinda Newman of HitFix criticized the video's first half, calling it "predictable." The video's second half, however, was met with praise with Newman commenting that the 'special effects at the end almost redeem it."

Second version

The song's second video was released via Kesha's YouTube account. She revealed the video's completion, release and inspiration through a video description quote saying, "heyy to all my fans! so me [and] my friends were bored and we were really channeling some 80's [inspiration] (Tron, David Bowie in Labyrinth, and Revenge of the Nerds.) and we made this new video for take it off. it was really fun to make. i hope you guys like it". The video was directed by Skinny. This version of the video is known as "Take it Off (K$ N' Friends Version)".

The video begins with a scene of a leopard with glowing blue eyes (later revealed to be Kesha) walking down an alleyway. The song's title flashes on the screen and the video pans to Kesha. She walks down the alleyway with two men who grab another man. Kesha spray-paints a dollar sign on his chest. They come to a party where she and her friends flash their tattooed dollar signs on their wrists and forearms in order to enter. As they enter, everyone starts dancing and the party-goers' faces are shown changing into different animals'. In the following scene, Kesha is seen sitting on a chair with two men by her side. Jeffree Star then approaches Kesha. Kesha and Star engage in a choreographed dance battle; Star then shoots Kesha with a laser chain saw which she deflects with her bracelet, Kesha responds by shooting lasers out of her hands, killing Star. After the battle the party-goers crawl around Kesha and she is seen holding a gold cup with a blue foaming liquid spilling over the top of the glass. As Kesha gives the party goers a drink, their faces turn into different kinds of animals. The video ends with everyone dancing and turning into half animal humans, Kesha however, drinks from the cup and turns back into a leopard.

Live performances
On August 13, 2010, Kesha performed "Take It Off" alongside earlier singles "Your Love Is My Drug" and "Tik Tok" on Today. In the performance, she is seen wearing boots, fishnets, glitter shorts and a loose tank top. By the second verse, her dancers, that are dressed in black start to undress as the chorus starts, revealing gold shirts and tank-tops. The performance featured smoke machines with Kesha playing notes on an electric keyboard while crawling on the floor. She has also performed the song in a set for BBC Radio 1's Big Weekend. "Take It Off" was performed on November 21, 2010, at the 2010 American Music Awards. The performance started off with Kesha opening with "Take It Off" while playing on the keyboard wearing a glowing robot helmet; she soon transitioned into "We R Who We R". Kesha also performed the song during her first concert tour, titled Get Sleazy Tour. The song were performed just next to the opening track, "Sleazy".

Credits and personnel
Recording
Conway Recording Studios, Los Angeles, California, and at Dr. Luke's studio, Los Angeles, California.
Personnel
Songwriting – Kesha Sebert, Lukasz Gottwald, Claude Kelly
Production – Dr. Luke
Production coordination – Vanessa Sikberman, Megan Dennis, Becky Scott
Instruments and programming – Dr. Luke
Vocal Editing – Emily Wright
Background Vocals – Claude Kelly, Aniela Gottwald, Tatiana Gottwald, Lukasz Gottwald, Graham Bryce
Engineering – Emily Wright, Sam Holland

Credits adapted from the liner notes of Animal'', Kemosabe Recordings, RCA Records.

Charts

Weekly charts

Year-end charts

Certifications

Release history

References

2009 songs
2010 singles
Kesha songs
Music videos directed by Paul Hunter (director)
Songs written by Dr. Luke
Song recordings produced by Dr. Luke
Songs written by Kesha
Songs written by Claude Kelly
RCA Records singles
LGBT-related songs